Ngoshie is a Southern Bantoid language of Cameroon.

External links 
 George W Gregg - A sociolinguistic survey (RA/RTT) of Ngie and Ngishe (Momo Division, North West Province, Republic of Cameroon)

References

Momo languages
Languages of Cameroon